Aspe is a surname. Notable people with the surname include:

Alberto García Aspe (born 1967), Mexican footballer
Elisabeth Aspe (1860–1927), Estonian writer
Mauricio Aspe (born 1973), Mexican actor
Pedro Aspe (born 1950), Mexican economist
Pieter Aspe (1953–2021), Belgian/Flemish novelist
Renée Aspe (1922–1969), French painter

Spanish-language surnames